Pseudonaclia bifasciata is a moth in the subfamily Arctiinae. It was described by Per Olof Christopher Aurivillius in 1909 and is found in Kenya and Tanzania.

References

Arctiidae genus list at Butterflies and Moths of the World of the Natural History Museum

Moths described in 1909
Arctiinae